Mount Troubridge is a mountain over 1,000 m, surmounting the east end of Hedgpeth Heights in the Anare Mountains. Discovered and rudely charted in January 1841 by Captain James Ross, Royal Navy, who named it for R. Admiral Sir Edward Thomas Troubridge, one of the junior lords of the Admiralty at that time.

Mountains of Victoria Land
Pennell Coast